Kaufbeuren station is a railway station in the municipality of Kaufbeuren, located in Bavaria, Germany.

References

Kaufbeuren
Buildings and structures in Kaufbeuren
Railway stations in Germany opened in 1847